Liftoff! is a board game published in 1989 by Task Force Games.

Contents
Liftoff! is a game in which the winner of a space race from the 1950s to the early 1970s is the first player to get a moon landing having completed all the preparatory missions.

Reception
Mike Siggins reviewed Liftoff! for Games International magazine, and gave it a rating of 8 out of 10, and stated that "I know deep down that it is not going to appeal to everyone, yet there is definitely something there that triggered my interest. I suppose it is best described as a game in which to participate rather than play, like being involved in an unfolding story."

References

Board games introduced in 1989
Task Force Games games